In mathematics normal convergence is a type of convergence for series of functions.  Like absolute-convergence, it has the useful property that it is preserved when the order of summation is changed.

History 

The concept of normal convergence was first introduced by René Baire in 1908 in his book Leçons sur les théories générales de l'analyse.

Definition 
Given a set S and functions  (or to any normed vector space), the series

is called normally convergent if the series of uniform norms of the terms of the series converges, i.e.,

Distinctions 
Normal convergence implies, but should not be confused with, uniform absolute convergence, i.e. uniform convergence of the series of nonnegative functions .  To illustrate this, consider

 

Then the series  is uniformly convergent (for any ε take n ≥ 1/ε), but the series of uniform norms is the harmonic series and thus diverges.  An example using continuous functions can be made by replacing these functions with bump functions of height 1/n and width 1 centered at each natural number n.

As well, normal convergence of a series is different from norm-topology convergence, i.e. convergence of the partial sum sequence in the topology induced by the uniform norm.  Normal convergence implies norm-topology convergence if and only if the space of functions under consideration is complete with respect to the uniform norm.  (The converse does not hold even for complete function spaces: for example, consider the harmonic series as a sequence of constant functions).

Generalizations

Local normal convergence 

A series can be called "locally normally convergent on X" if each point x in X has a neighborhood U such that the series of functions ƒn restricted to the domain U

is normally convergent, i.e. such that

where the norm  is the supremum over the domain U.

Compact normal convergence 

A series is said to be "normally convergent on compact subsets of X" or "compactly normally convergent on X" if for every compact subset K of X, the series of functions ƒn restricted to K

is normally convergent on K.

Note: if X is locally compact (even in the weakest sense), local normal convergence and compact normal convergence are equivalent.

Properties 
 Every normal convergent series is uniformly convergent, locally uniformly convergent, and compactly uniformly convergent. This is very important, since it assures that any re-arrangement of the series, any derivatives or integrals of the series, and sums and products with other convergent series will converge to the "correct" value.

See also
Modes of convergence (annotated index)

References

Mathematical analysis
Convergence (mathematics)